The Guckenheimer Warehouse, or the former Guckenheimer Whiskey Warehouse, is located at 125 First Avenue in the Downtown neighborhood of Pittsburgh, Pennsylvania. The building served as the warehouse for the Guckenheimer Whiskey barrels, which were distilled in Freeport, Pennsylvania, until prohibition caused the company to shut down.

History 
The first mention of the lot on which the current building sits was in 1786 when it was sold by John Penn, the brother of William Penn, to John Wilkins. The lot was sold again in 1821 and 1855 by Sheriff's sale.

No buildings were noted to have been located on the lot when Asher Guckenheimer bought the property in September 1863, as the previous structure was destroyed during the Great Fire of 1845.

Guckenheimer built the current building circa 1882 as a warehouse for his whiskey company, A. Guckenheimer & Bros. The Guckenheimer Whiskey company was first established in 1857 by Asher Guckenheimer and his half-brother, Samuel Wertheimer. They originally bought their liquor from Thomas Bell, who had been making a highly regarded product since 1845 in Freeport.

Following Bell's death in 1865, they bought his distillery and enlarged it, but the demand outpaced production so they bought a new and much larger facility in 1866. Guckenheimer's Rye became one of the country's most famous brands, scoring a 99 out of 100 at the Columbian Exposition in Chicago, and winning top honors in 1893. The building that Guckenheimer built in Pittsburgh continuously served as a warehouse for the product until the company disbanded due to prohibition. 

After Asher Guckenheimer's death, the company changed hands several times. Although new owners attempted to continue to sell the whiskey in 1925, despite prohibition, they were ultimately stopped from doing so when the corporation and thirteen of its workers were indicted on charges relating to conspiring to obtain the release of a large quantity of whiskey from bond to sell and deliver it unlawfully. Found guilty, the company was forced to sell its warehouse to the Landau Brothers Contracting and Building Company, which then owned the building until it was sold in 1980 to Paddington Associates. Paddington Associates subsequently leased the building to the Stonecipher Law Firm, which is the current tenant of the building. 

The building was nominated in January 1995 to become a City Historic Site by Preservation Pittsburgh.

Architecture 
The building was designed in the Richardsonian Romanesque architectural style. It is one of the best surviving structures in the Market Street commercial district, and is an example of heavy timber construction in a commercial building. The high ceilings, massive wood beams, and exposed brick are all examples of the building's architectural style, and contribute to it being a rarity in Pittsburgh architecture.

Gallery

References 

Commercial buildings in Pittsburgh
Commercial buildings completed in 1882
City of Pittsburgh historic designations
1882 establishments in Pennsylvania